Akhamaman (also known as Akhamwun (အခမွန်); d.  1287) was the self-proclaimed king of Pegu, in modern Myanmar, with the title of Thunekkhat Yaza (သုနက္ခတ် ရာဇာ) from 1285 to  1287. He was one of several regional strongmen who emerged during the final years of the Pagan Empire in the 1280s. As the ruler of Pegu, he successfully fended off two attacks by King Narathihapate's forces. After the victory, however, he became deeply unpopular for his increasingly autocratic rule, and was assassinated.

Early life
Chronicles report his name as Akhamaman (အခမမန်း; A-Kha-Ma-Man) and as Akhamwun (အခမွန်; A-Kha-Mun). He was a commoner of either Burman or mixed Burman-Mon background. Born near Pegu, he was educated at a local Buddhist monastery, and initially planned to become an ordained monk. Indeed, he was already a samanera (novice monk) when he left the order to marry a daughter of a local official, Ma Ta-Shauk.

Royal service
It was Akhamaman's father-in-law that got him into the royal service. Ta-Shauk in his official capacity often had to travel to the capital Pagan (Bagan), and wanted his son-in-law to join the service. Initially, Akhamaman repeatedly put off joining the service for the first few years until his father-in-law finally forced him to. He then went to the capital, and eventually became a rower on the royal yacht. It turned out to be his break. The commoner served with distinction, and was noticed by King Narathihapate. He had impressed the king sufficiently that after his term at Pagan was over, the king appointed him as a customs officer at Pegu. It may have been  1273.

The ex-rower's career continued to rise at Pegu. Though it was a minor appointment—Pegu was still a small town at the time—he nonetheless managed to become the key Pagan official at Pegu in the following years. By leveraging his father-in-law's extensive network in the region, he came to be responsible for not only collecting taxes but also settling trade disputes. By the mid-1280s, when Pagan was fighting a losing war against the Mongol invaders, Akhamaman had emerged as the main political and civic leader of Pegu. With anarchy around the corner, he and other leaders of Pegu decided to build a stockade and a moat around the town.

King of Pegu
By 1285, the Mongol army had decisively defeated the Burmese army in the north. The king fled to Lower Burma, and the country fell into chaos. In Lower Burma, the king found himself isolated. Although his sons ruled the key Lower Burma ports (Prome (Pyay), Dala and Bassein), the king did not trust any of them, and he and his court settled at Hlegya, west of Prome (Pyay). Without the full support of his sons, the presence of the king and his small army impressed no one. When the king called for support from his nominal vassals, Akhamaman and the Pegu leadership saw no reason to respond. Indeed, Akhamaman had proclaimed himself king of Pegu with the title of Thunekkhat Yaza (သုနက္ခတ် ရာဇာ).

To be sure, the self-proclaimed king's realm amounted to just the immediate region around his small town. To his west and south, he was still hemmed in by Prome and Dala, ruled by Pagan princes, Thihathu of Prome and Kyawswa of Dala, respectively. To his east, the Martaban (Mottama) province was controlled by another rebel Wareru. To his north, Thawun Gyi was in charge of Toungoo (Taungoo). Since the king did not control any of their surrounding regions, the Pegu leadership believed that they would be low on the king's priority list, and their defensive preparations progressed slowly. However, to their surprise, the king managed to send a small army to Pegu. When the army showed up at their doorstep, they readily surrendered. They convinced the commander that it had been a misunderstanding all along, and that they remained loyal to the king. Their deception was successful. But later that night, the Pagan general and the staff died from eating the poisoned dried game meat offered to them by Akhamaman's men. After the death of the general, the remaining troops retreated. The king ordered another expedition but Pegu was now ready. The army could not take the well-stockaded town, and had to retreat.

It was Narathihapate's last attempt to regain Pegu. With Pagan out of the picture, Akhamaman increasingly turned autocratic, and became hated by the people. In all, his reign lasted anywhere from two to seven years. He was assassinated by Lekkhaya Byu, one of his brothers-in-law. But Lekkhaya's reign lasted just eight days. Lekkhaya in turn was assassinated by A-Che-Mun, a brother-in-law by marriage of Akhamaman.

Notes

References

Bibliography
 
 
 
 
 
 
 
 
 
 
 

Pagan dynasty
1250s births
1280s deaths
13th-century Burmese people